The Beverly Grammar School is a rare historic First Period schoolhouse in Beverly, Massachusetts, USA.  The building, now a modest private residence, contains internal evidence that part of it was built c. 1716 for use as a schoolhouse.  It was listed on the National Register of Historic Places in 1990.

Description and history
The former Beverly Grammar School building is located in a mainly residential area just north of downtown Beverly, on the west side of Essex Street between Charnock and Monroe Streets.  It is a small single-story wood-frame structure, with a side gable roof, central chimney, and clapboarded exterior.  It has a five-bay front facade, with narrow one-over-one sash windows in the outer bays, and a projecting entry vestibule at the center.  The interior consists of two chambers, a larger one on the left and a smaller one to the right.

The building's internal structure is consistent with documentary evidence that its left side was built about 1716 as a schoolhouse.  It has no evidence that it was built with a chimney (the present one was added in the 19th century for a stove), and the right-side chamber is a later 18th-century addition.  Portions of the lath on the right side are decorated with what appear to be drawings by children, a suggestion that they were originally part of pupils' desks.

See also
National Register of Historic Places listings in Essex County, Massachusetts

References

School buildings on the National Register of Historic Places in Massachusetts
Schools in Beverly, Massachusetts
National Register of Historic Places in Essex County, Massachusetts